Piz Curvér is a mountain of the Oberhalbstein Range, between Andeer and Savognin, in the canton of Graubünden.

External links

 Piz Curvér on Hikr

Mountains of the Alps
Mountains of Switzerland
Mountains of Graubünden
Two-thousanders of Switzerland
Andeer
Surses